The 1917 college football season ended with six undefeated teams in Georgia Tech, Pittsburgh, Ohio State, Texas A&M, Williams, and Washington State.

The Official NCAA Division I Football Records Book lists only Georgia Tech as national champions, the South's first.

Tech coach John Heisman challenged Pitt coach Pop Warner to a postseason contest to determine a national champion, but as such a match did not occur until the next season. The Golden Tornado was invited to play a 4–3 Oregon team in the Rose Bowl, but by then many players had joined the war effort.

In the second week of play, Georgia Tech beat Penn 41–0. Bernie McCarty called it "Strupper's finest hour, coming through against powerful Penn in the contest that shocked the East." By comparison, Pitt defeated Penn 14–6.

Conference and program changes

Conference changes
One conference changed its name for the 1917 season:
Michigan rejoined the Intercollegiate Conference of Faculty Representatives (commonly known as the Big Nine Conference) after a nine-year absence. As such, the league was first unofficially coined the Big Ten, the name it possesses today.

Membership changes

September
September 29
In a doubleheader, Georgia Tech beat Furman and then Wake Forest; 25–0 and 33–0 respectively. Navy beat Davidson 27–6. Pitt beat West Virginia 14–9.

October
October 6
Georgia Tech beat Penn at home 41 to 0. Centre beat KMI 104–0. West Virginia beat Navy 6–0. Williams beat Cornell 14–10.

October 7
Georgia Tech beat Cumberland at home 222–0. http://www.espn.com/blog/statsinfo/post/_/id/124864/100-years-ago-georgia-techs-222-0-victory

October 13
Georgia Tech beat Davidson 32–10, its closest game all season.  DePauw beat Centre 6–0. Syracuse beat Rutgers 14–10. Wisconsin tied Notre Dame 0–0.

October 20
Georgia Tech beat  Washington & Lee 63–0. Auburn beat Clemson 7–0. Pittsburgh beat Syracuse 28–0. Nebraska beat Notre Dame 7–0. Washington State beat Oregon 26–3.

October 27
Undefeated Pittsburgh beat Penn on the road 14 to 6. Auburn beat Mississippi A&M 13–6.

November
November 3
Georgia Tech gave Vanderbilt its worst ever beating, 83–0. Auburn crushed Florida 68–0. Centre beat Kentucky 3–0. Texas A&M beat Tulane 35–0. Wisconsin beat Minnesota 10–7. Illinois tied Chicago 0–0. Rutgers tied West Virginia 3–3.

November 10
A freshman Buck Flowers at Davidson upset Auburn 21–7. All of Georgia Tech's backs rushed for 100 yards in a 48–0 defeat of Tulane. Texas A&M beat Baylor 7–0. Ohio State beat Wisconsin 16–3. Navy beat Georgetown 28–7.

November 17
Georgia Tech beat Carlisle 98–0.  Penn beat Michigan 16–0. Ohio State beat Illinois 13–0.

November 24
Auburn fought undefeated Ohio State to a scoreless tie. Coach Heisman  of Georgia Tech(who previously coached at Auburn) and his players were at the game, rooting for the Tigers. Minnesota beat Illinois 27–6.

November 29
Georgia Tech beat Auburn 68 to 7. Davidson beat Clemson 21–9. Mississippi A&M beat Haskell 7–6.

Rose Bowl
The Mare Island Marines defeated Camp Lewis, 19–7, in the 1918 Rose Bowl.

Conference standings

Major conference standings

Independents

Minor conferences

Minor conference standings

Awards and honors

All-Americans

The consensus All-America team included:

Statistical leaders
 Team scoring most points: Georgia Tech, 491
 Player scoring most points: Bill Ingram, Navy, 162
 Player scoring most touchdowns: Albert Hill, Georgia Tech, 23
 Player scoring most goals after touchdown: Bill Fincher, Georgia Tech, 49
 Rushing yards leader: Everett Strupper, Georgia Tech, 1150
 Rushing avg. leader: Everett Strupper, 10.1

References